Goliath and the Rebel Slave, also known as The Tyrant of Lydia Against the Son of Hercules, is a 1963 Eastmancolor adventure peplum film directed by Mario Caiano.

Plot

Cast 
 Gordon Scott as Goliath 
 Ombretta Colli as Princess Cori 
 Massimo Serato as Marcius 
 Mimmo Palmara as Artafernes 
 Giuseppe Fortis as Barbuk
 Gabriele Antonini as  Alexander the Great 
 Serge Nubret as Milan 
 Gloria Milland as Zoé 
 Mirko Ellis

Release
Goliath and the Rebel Slave was released in Italy on September 5, 1963. It was released in the United States in 1964 as The Tyrant of Lydia Against the Son of Hercules.

Reception
A contemporary review in the Monthly Film Bulletin referred to the film as a "sluggish, run-of-the-mill affair which is weighed down by arguments, disputes and torturous double-crossings." The review concluded that "the script is naive, the colour print poor, and the whole thing takes an age to disentangle itself"

Footnotes

References

External links
 
 
 

1963 films
Films directed by Mario Caiano
Peplum films
1960s adventure films
Films set in ancient Greece
Films set in the 4th century BC
Cultural depictions of Alexander the Great
Sword and sandal films
Goliath
1960s Italian films